No Stranger to Love is a studio album by American musician Roy Ayers, released in November 1979 through Polydor Records. Recording sessions for the album took place at Automated Sound Studios and Sigma Sound Studios in New York City, and at Kendun Recorders in Burbank, California. Production was handled by William Allen and Ayers.

The album peaked at number 82 on the Billboard 200 albums chart and at number 22 on the Top R&B/Hip-Hop Albums chart in the United States. Both of its singles, "Don't Stop the Feeling" and "What You Won't Do for Love", peaked at numbers 32 and 73, respectively, on the Hot R&B/Hip-Hop Songs chart.

Track listing

Charts

References

External links 

1979 albums
Roy Ayers albums
Polydor Records albums
Albums produced by Roy Ayers
Albums recorded at Sigma Sound Studios